This is a list of banks in Turkmenistan.

Central bank
Central Bank of Turkmenistan

Commercial banks
Dayhanbank (Agricultural Bank), Asgabat (state bank) 
HalkBank SCB, Ashgabat (state bank) http://www.halkbank.gov.tm/
Garagum IJSB, Asgabat 
Prezidentbank, Asgabat 
Rysgal JSCB, Asgabat
Senagat JSCB, Asgabat 
The State Bank for Foreign Economic Affairs of Turkmenistan, Asgabat (state bank) 
The State Development Bank of Turkmenistan
Turkmenbashybank, Asgabat (state bank) 
Turkmenistanbank, Asgabat (state bank)
Turkmen-Turkish Bank JSCB, Asgabat

References
Portalino

Turkmenistan
Banks
Turkmenistan